

Maximilian de Angelis (2 October 1889 – 6 December 1974) was a general in the Wehrmacht of Nazi Germany during World War II. He was a recipient of the Knight's Cross of the Iron Cross with Oak Leaves.

On 4 April 1946 Angelis was extradited to Yugoslavia and sentenced to 20 years for war crimes. He was then extradited to the Soviet Union and sentenced to two times 25 years. He was released in 1955 and repatriated to Germany.

Awards

 Iron Cross (1939) 2nd Class (13 May 1940) & 1st Class (1 June 1940)
 Knight's Cross of the Iron Cross with Oak Leaves
 Knight's Cross on 9 February 1942 as Generalleutnant and commander of the 76. Infanterie-Division
 323rd Oak Leaves on 12 November 1943 as General der Artillerie and commanding general of the XXXXIV. Armeekorps

References

Citations

Bibliography

 
 

1889 births
1974 deaths
Military personnel from Budapest
German Army generals of World War II
Generals of Artillery (Wehrmacht)
Austro-Hungarian military personnel of World War I
Austrian military personnel of World War II
World War II prisoners of war held by the United States
People from the Kingdom of Hungary
Recipients of the Knight's Cross of the Iron Cross with Oak Leaves
Austrian prisoners of war
World War I prisoners of war held by Italy
Austrian Nazis
World War II prisoners of war held by the Soviet Union
Austrian Nazis convicted of war crimes
Prisoners and detainees of Yugoslavia
Austro-Hungarian Army officers
Hungarian people of Italian descent
Austrian people of Italian descent
Theresian Military Academy alumni